KBRK-FM (93.7 FM, "B93.7") is a radio station broadcasting a hot adult contemporary music format. The station is licensed to serve Brookings in the U.S. state of South Dakota. The station is currently owned by Alpha Media, through licensee Digity 3E License, LLC.

References

External links
B93.7 official website

BRK-FM
Hot adult contemporary radio stations in the United States
Radio stations established in 1974
Alpha Media radio stations